Oliver Michael Robert Eden, 8th Baron Henley, 6th Baron Northington PC (born 22 November 1953), is a British hereditary peer and politician, who is a Conservative member of the House of Lords. He has served in a number of ministerial positions in the governments of Margaret Thatcher, John Major, David Cameron and Theresa May, most recently as Parliamentary Under-Secretary of State at the Department for Business, Energy and Industrial Strategy.

Lord Henley served as a Minister of State at the Home Office with responsibility for Crime Prevention and Anti-Social Behaviour Reduction, a role in which he succeeded Lady Browning in September 2011 to September 2012.

Early life
Lord Henley is the eldest son and fourth child of Michael, the seventh Baron, and Nancy Mary Walton. He was educated at Clifton College. He graduated from Collingwood College, Durham University, with a Bachelor of Arts (BA) degree in 1975. He was called to the Bar by the Middle Temple in 1977.

Political career

By right as an hereditary peer
Lord Henley succeeded to the peerage in 1977 upon the death of his father. An Irish peer, he is able to sit in the House of Lords by virtue of a United Kingdom peerage granted to the 3rd Baron Henley, namely Baron Northington. He was an elected County Councillor for Cumbria from 1986 to 1989. He was also at that time President of the Cumbria Association of Local Councils.

He served as a House of Lords whip under Margaret Thatcher from 1989 to July 1990. He then moved to become a Parliamentary Under-Secretary of State at the Department of Social Security, retaining the position when John Major rose to power and serving until 1993. He was then briefly moved to the Department of Employment, when in 1994 he was again fleetingly moved to the Ministry of Defence. In 1995 he was promoted to Minister of State at the Department for Education and Employment, serving until the Conservative government lost the 1997 general election.

By election from among hereditary peers
With the passage of the House of Lords Act 1999, Lord Henley along with almost all other hereditary peers lost his automatic right to sit in the House of Lords. He was however elected as one of the 92 hereditary peers to remain in the House of Lords pending completion of House of Lords reform. He first served as opposition spokesman for Home Affairs before becoming Opposition Chief Whip in the Lords from 1998 to 2001 and as Opposition spokesman for Justice from 2003 to 2010.

After the 6 May 2010 general election, Lord Henley was appointed Parliamentary Under-Secretary of State at the Department for Environment, Food and Rural Affairs (Defra) in the Cameron Ministry. He was promoted to Minister of State at the Home Office on 16 September 2011, with special responsibility for crime prevention and anti-social behaviour reduction, replacing Baroness Browning who stepped down for health reasons. He was a member of the Joint Committee on Human Rights until November 2016. On 21 November 2016, it had been announced that he had been appointed a Lord in Waiting, one of the government whips in the House of Lords. In addition to that role, he was appointed as Parliamentary Under-Secretary of State at the Department for Work and Pensions on 21 December 2016.

He was appointed to the Privy Council (PC) in 2013.

Personal life
Eden married Caroline Patricia Sharp, daughter of Alan G. Sharp, on 11 October 1984. The couple has four children. The family seat is Scaleby Castle, Carlisle.

References

 

1953 births
Alumni of Collingwood College, Durham
Barons in the Peerage of Ireland
Northington, Oliver Eden, 6th Baron
Conservative Party (UK) Baronesses- and Lords-in-Waiting
Oliver Eden
Living people
Members of the Privy Council of the United Kingdom
People educated at Clifton College
English lawyers
Barons Henley
Hereditary peers elected under the House of Lords Act 1999